Mohammad A. Quayum (born 30 June 1954) is an academic, writer, editor, critic and translator.

Life
Quayum was born in Gopalganj, Bangladesh on 30 June 1954. He has taught at universities in Australia, Bangladesh, Malaysia, Singapore and the US, and is currently Professor of English at International Islamic University Malaysia, and adjunct professor in the College of Humanities, Arts and Social Sciences at Flinders University, and School of Education at the University of South Australia.
He is the founding editor of Asiatic: IIUM Journal of English Language and Literature, and has to date published 34 books and more than 140 journal articles, book chapters and encyclopaedia entries in the areas of American literature, Bengali literature and Southeast Asian literature. Between 1993 and 2000 he served as co-editor of the journal World Literature Written in English (now Journal of Postcolonial Writing). He is on the advisory board of the Journal of Postcolonial Writing, Transnational Literature, Interdisciplinary Literary Studies: A Journal of Criticism and Theory, The Rupkatha Journal on Interdisciplinary Studies in Humanities, Journal of Postcolonial Cultures and Societies, Writing Today: International Journal of Studies in English and The Apollonian: A Journal of Interdisciplinary Studies. He is also on the editorial board of The Literary Encyclopedia.

Quayum is regarded as a leading critic of Malaysian-Singaporean literature and of the Bengali poet and Asia's first Nobel Laureate, Rabindranath Tagore.

Selected books

Authored
 Beyond Boundaries: Critical Essays on Rabindranath Tagore. Dhaka: Bangla Academy, 2014. .
 One Sky, Many Horizons: Studies in Malaysian Literature in English.Kuala Lumpur: Marshall Cavendish, 2007. 
 Saul Bellow and American Transcendentalism. New York: Peter Lang, 2004.  .
 Colonial to Global: Malaysian Women's Writing in English 1940s–1990s. Malaysia: IIUM Press, 2001 and 2003. . (With Nor Faridah A. Manaf)
 Dictionary of Literary Terms. Kuala Lumpur: Prentice Hall, 2000. .

Translated
 Atiqur Rahman: Selected Poems. Dhaka: Bangla Prakash, 2017. . (With S. Nahleen)
 The Revolutionary (Kazi Nazrul Islam's Kuhelika). Dhaka: Nymphea Press, 2016. . (With Niaz Zaman)
 Rabindranath Tagore: The Ruined Nest and Other Stories. Kuala Lumpur: Silverfish Books, 2014. .
 The Essential Rokeya: Selected Works of Rokeya Sakhawat Hossain (1880–1932). Leiden, New York: Brill, 2013. . 
 Rabindranath Tagore: Selected Short Stories. New Delhi: Macmillan, 2011. .

Edited
 Reading Malaysian Literature in English: Ethnicity, Gender, Diaspora, and Nationalism. Singapore: Springer, 2021. . 
 Bangladeshi Literature in English: A Critical Anthology. Dhaka: Asiatic Society of Bangladesh, 2021. . (with Md. Mahmudul Hasan)
 Tagore, Nationalism and Cosmopolitanism: Perceptions, Contestations and Contemporary Relevance. UK: Routledge, 2020. . 
 Malaysian Literature in English: A Critical Companion. UK: Cambridge Scholars Publishing, 2020). .
 Religion, Culture, Society: Readings in the Humanities and Revealed Knowledge. Kuala Lumpur: Silverfish Books, 2017. . (With Hassan Ahmed Ibrahim)
 A Feminist Foremother: Critical Essays on Rokeya Sakhawat Hossain. New Delhi: Orient Longman (Orient Blackswan), 2016. . (With Md. Mahmudul Hasan)
 Twenty-two New Asian Short Stories. Kuala Lumpur: Silverfish Books, 2016. .
 The Poet and His World: Critical Essays on Rabindranath Tagore. New Delhi: Orient Longman. .
 Imagined Communities Revisited: Critical Essays on Asia-Pacific Literatures and Cultures. Kuala Lumpur: IIUM Press, 2011. . (With Nor Faridah A. Manaf)
 A Rainbow Feast: New Asian Short Stories. Singapore: Marshall Cavendish, 2010. .
 Sharing Borders: Studies in Contemporary Singaporean-Malaysian Literature. Singapore: National Library Board in partnership with Singapore Arts Council, 2009. . (With Wong Phui Nam)
 Peninsular Muse: Interviews with Modern Malaysian and Singaporean Poets, Novelists and Dramatists. Oxford, Bern: Peter Lang, 2007. .
 The Merlion and the Hibiscus: Contemporary Short Stories from Singapore and Malaysia. Penguin Books, 2002. .
 Singaporean Literature in English: A Critical Reader. Malaysia: University Putra Malaysia Press, 2002. . (With Peter Wicks)
 Malaysian Literature in English: A Critical Reader. Kuala Lumpur: Pearson Education, 2001. . (With Peter Wicks)
 Saul Bellow: The Man and His Work. New Delhi: B.R. Publishing, 2000. . (With Sukhbir Singh)
 In Blue Silk Girdle: Stories from Malaysia and Singapore. Malaysia: University Putra Malaysia Press, 1998. .

Festschrift
 Festschrift: The Poetry and Poetics of Shirley Geok-lin Lim, ed. Mohammad A. Quayum. The Journal of Transnational American Studies, Vol. 10, No. 2 (2019). .

References

Further reading
 Md. Mahmudul Hasan, “Editing Asiatic and the Burden of Carrying Mohammad A. Quayum’s Legacy Forward.” Asiatic: IIUM Journal of English Language and Literature, 14(2): 2020, 1-7. https://journals.iium.edu.my/asiatic/index.php/ajell/article/view/2127/1028.
 Shikhandin, "Writing Matters: In Conversation with Dr. Mohammad A. Quayum". Kitaab, 2018. https://kitaab.org/2018/03/01/writing-matters-in-conversation-with-dr-mohammad-a-quayum/.
 Md. Rezaul Haque, "In Conversation with Professor Mohammad A. Quayum". Writers in Conversation, 2014. https://www.academia.edu/8043156/In_Conversation_with_Professor_Mohammad_A_Quayum.

External links
 

1954 births
Living people
People from Gopalganj District, Bangladesh
Bangladeshi academics
20th-century Bangladeshi writers
20th-century male writers
21st-century Bangladeshi writers
21st-century male writers
Academic staff of Flinders University
Academic staff of the International Islamic University Malaysia
University of Dhaka alumni
Lakehead University alumni
Flinders University alumni